C. R. Ramaswamy was an Indian politician and former Member of the Legislative Assembly of Tamil Nadu. He was elected to the Tamil Nadu legislative assembly from Mylapore constituency as an Indian National Congress candidate in 1952, and 1957 elections.

References 

Members of the Tamil Nadu Legislative Assembly
Indian National Congress politicians from Tamil Nadu
Living people
Year of birth missing (living people)